Eurythmia is a genus of snout moths. It was described by Émile Louis Ragonot in 1887.

Species
 Eurythmia angulella Ely, 1910
 Eurythmia fumella Ely, 1910
 Eurythmia hospitella Zeller, 1875
 Eurythmia yavapaella Dyar, 1906

References

Phycitinae
Taxa named by Émile Louis Ragonot
Pyralidae genera